The State Museum of Culture History of Uzbekistan (Oʻzbekiston madaniyati tarixi davlat muzeyi Samarqand) is a museum of history and culture in Samarkand.

The museum has a famous silver bowl from the period of the Alchon Huns (6th century CE), named the "Chilek bowl". The "Chilek bowl" is considered as the "best known specimen of Hephthalite art", which is similar in composition with the Hephthalite silver bowl in the British Museum, but represents "six dancers in Indian costume with Iranian ribbons and Hephthalite-short heads". It is considered as an Alchon object, but possibly manufactured in India at the request of the Alchons.

External links
 Intouruz guide

References

Museums in Uzbekistan